Epia hiemalis is a moth in the Bombycidae family. It was described by Arthur Gardiner Butler in 1878. It is found in the Amazon region.

The forewings are dark purplish brown. The hindwings are olivaceous towards the base.

References

Arctiidae genus list at Butterflies and Moths of the World of the Natural History Museum

Bombycidae
Moths described in 1878